Symco is an unincorporated community located in the town of Union, Waupaca County, Wisconsin, United States.

Symco has a car show called Symco Shakedown its in every second weekend of August.

Notable people 
John Scanlon, Irish-born farmer and Greenback Party state legislator

References 

Unincorporated communities in Waupaca County, Wisconsin
Unincorporated communities in Wisconsin